was a Japanese writer, winner of the Naoki Prize. He was also an ordained priest within the Ōtani-ha branch of Jōdo Shinshū Buddhism.

Life 
He was born in Nagoya, and graduated from the Political Economy Department of Waseda University. He studied writing screenplays in Paris, France, and made his debut in 1978 with Henchō nininbaori.  In 2009 he was diagnosed with stomach cancer. He died, after the cancer also spread to the liver, on October 19, 2013.

Awards 
 1978 – Gen'eijō New Writers Award for "Henchō Nininbaori" (short story)
 1981 – Mystery Writers of Japan Award for Best Short Story for "Modorigawa Shinjū"
 1984 – Yoshikawa Eiji Prize for New Writers for Yoimachigusa Yojō (short story collection)
 1984 – Naoki Prize for Koibumi (short story collection)
 1996 – Shibata Renzaburō Award for Kakuregiku (novel)

Bibliography

Novels
 , 1979
 , 1983
 , 1984
 , 1985
 , 1986
 , 1987
 , 1988
 , 1989
 , 1989
 , 1990
 , 1990
 , 1991
 , 1992
 , 1993
 , 1993
 , 1993
 , 1994
 , 1994
 , 1995
 , 1995
 , 1996
 , 1996
 , 2000
 , 2000
 , 2002
 , 2002
 , 2003
 , 2008

Short story collections
 , 1980
 , 1981
 , 1982
 , 1983
 , 1983
 , 1983
 , 1984
 , 1984
 , 1984
 , 1985
 , 1985
 , 1986
 , 1986
 , 1987
 , 1988
 , 1988
 , 1988
 , 1989
 , 1989
 , 1990
 , 1991
 , 1993
 , 1993
 , 1993
 , 1994
 , 1994
 , 1997
 , 1997
 , 1999
 , 2001
 , 2002

Film adaptations 
Many of his writings have been made into movies.
Love Letter (Koibumi)

References

External links

1948 births
2013 deaths
20th-century Japanese novelists
21st-century Japanese novelists
Japanese male short story writers
Japanese mystery writers
Mystery Writers of Japan Award winners
People from Nagoya
20th-century Japanese short story writers
21st-century Japanese short story writers
20th-century Japanese male writers
21st-century male writers
Jōdo Shinshū Buddhist priests